Ibbenbüren (Westphalian: Ippenbürn) is a medium-sized town in the district of Steinfurt, in North Rhine-Westphalia, Germany.

Geography
Ibbenbüren is situated on the Ibbenbürener Aa river, at the northwest end of the Teutoburger forest and rather exactly in the center of the two cities Rheine in the west and Osnabrück in the east, both approximately 20 km away.

History
Ibbenbüren is mentioned in documentary evidence for the first time in 1146, when the bishop of Osnabrück at that time, Philipp of Katzenelnbogen, donated a tenth of his possessions in Ibbenbüren to the Getrudenkloster of Osnabrück. Although Ibbenbüren was already much older and a document of the year 1348 mentions the establishment of a church in the year 799, though the year 1146 is officially considered as the year of the foundation of Ibbenbüren.

In the years 1219 and/or 1234 it appears as a church village. In the transition from the High Middle Ages to the Late Middle Ages the noble gentlemen of Ibbenbüren, that is the abbot of Herford and the counts of Tecklenburg, possessed basic rule of the place. At this time Ibbenbüren belonged to the Diocese of Osnabrück. During this time the castle of Ibbenbüren was built by the noble gentlemen of Ibbenbüren starting from 1150. The last remains of this castle are the remnants of the heath tower in the proximity of the Aasee.

After the noble gentleman of Ibbenbüren died out, Ibbenbüren came under the exclusive rule of the counts of Tecklenburg. This rule lasted until the end of the 15th or beginning of the 16th century, when Ibbenbüren finally fell into the possession of Charles V in 1548 by awkward and luckless tactics used by the counts of Tecklenburg. Karl donated it to his sister Mary of Habsburg, governor of the Netherlands. Ibbenbüren was assigned to the office of Lingen. Into this period also falls the beginning of coal mining.

After Ibbenbüren repeatedly fell under control of the Netherlands and Spain in the Dutch Revolt, it was assigned to the House of Orange-Nassau after the Peace of Westphalia in 1648. Around this time was the beginning of iron ore mining in and around Ibbenbüren, which ended in the first half of the 19th century. By succession it came under Prussian rule in 1702. On February 1, 1724, Ibbenbüren attained municipal rights, which stood among other things in connection with the introduction of  excise duty. In 1743 the first magistrate and mayor were appointed.

During the rule of Napoleon Bonaparte at the beginning of the 19th century, Ibbenbüren belonged to the first French Empire, until it was freed by Prussian and Russian troops in 1815. It came back under Prussian rule on January 1, 1816, and was assigned to the district of Tecklenburg. After the end of World War II the city Ibbenbüren and the municipality Ibbenbüren Land were formed on December 31, 1974, into the department federation Ibbenbüren, resulting in today's city of Ibbenbüren. With the simultaneous dissolution of the district of Tecklenburg and fusion with the old district of Burgsteinfurt, Ibbenbüren was assigned to the new district of Steinfurt.

On 16 May 2015, a passenger train collided with a vehicle on a level crossing at Ibbenbüren. Two people were killed and 20 were injured, three seriously.

Coat of arms
Coat of arms displays an upright golden anchor on a blue shield. The colours blue and gold represent the city colours. The origin of the anchor is not known, but the anchor is also on the coat of arms of the neighbouring earldom of Lingen, which has a harbour. The anchor could depict the port customs office, which was owned by the earl.

Transport

The town has three stations on the Löhne-Rheine railway provides connections to Osnabrück and Bielefeld.

Twin towns – sister cities

Ibbenbüren is twinned with:
 Dessau-Roßlau, Germany
 Gourdon, France
 Hellendoorn, Netherlands
 Jastrzębie-Zdrój, Poland
 Prievidza, Slovakia

Notable people
Ignatz Wiemeler (1895–1952), bookbinder and educator
Bernhard Bergmeyer (1897–1987), politician (CDU)
Hermann Gösmann (1904–1979), lawyer and football administrator
Hermann Michel (1935–1984?), football player and coach
Ingrid Remmers (born 1965), politician (The Left)
Timo Dierkes (born 1967), actor
Anja Karliczek (born 1971), politician (CDU)
Tino Wenzel (born 1973), sport shooter
Kerstin Garefrekes (born 1979), footballer
Christine Wenzel (née Brinker) (born 1981), skeet shooter, Olympic medalist
Simon Rolfes (born 1982), footballer
Lars Unnerstall (born 1990), footballer
Marius Bülter (born 1993), footballer
Sebastian Klaas (born 1998), footballer

References

External links
  

 
Towns in North Rhine-Westphalia
Steinfurt (district)